Beijing Jishuitan Hospital 
(JST Hospital; simplified Chinese: 北京积水潭医院; traditional Chinese: 北京積水潭醫院),  
is a large public teaching hospital in Beijing, focusing mainly on orthopaedics and burn surgery. Founded in 1956, the hospital now has around 1000 beds. Its performance in medical care, teaching and researching led to it becoming the Fourth Medical College of Peking University. The hospital now has 200 doctors and 2200 other staff. The hospital has fully equipped departments of orthopaedics, spine surgery, adult joint reconstructive surgery, orthopaedic trauma, hand surgery, paediatric orthopaedics, bone tumor, sports medicines and burn surgery.

Some departments of the hospital are ranked among the leading positions in China, in particular orthopaedics and burn surgery. Special units based at the hospital include Beijing Bone and Arthropathy Research Center, Beijing Traumotology and Orthopaedics Research Center, Beijing Hand Surgery Research Center, Beijing Burn Surgery Research Center and Post Operative Total Joint Arthroplasty Evaluation Center. The first Orthopaedics Training Center was established on 27 April 2001.

Since its foundation, the hospital has won five state-level scientific awards.

References

Hospital buildings completed in 1953
Hospitals in Beijing
Hospitals established in 1956